Lithobates brownorum is a species of frog native to southern Veracruz and northeastern Oaxaca east through the Yucatan Peninsula and the uplands of Chiapas in southern Mexico through Guatemala and Honduras to Nicaragua. Its separateness from Lithobates berlandieri has been questioned but molecular data now supports the conclusion that it is a separate species.

References 

Lithobates
Amphibians of Guatemala
Amphibians of Honduras
Amphibians of Mexico
Amphibians of Nicaragua
Amphibians described in 1973